Ab Ti-ye Mahtab (also Romanized as Āb Tī-ye Mahtāb; also known as Āb Tī) is a village in Tayebi-ye Sarhadi-ye Sharqi Rural District, Charusa District, Kohgiluyeh County, Kohgiluyeh and Boyer-Ahmad Province, Iran. At the 2006 census, its population was 17, in 5 families.

References 

Populated places in Kohgiluyeh County